John Finlay may refer to:

Jack Finlay (1889–1942), Irish hurler for Laois, later TD for Laois-Offaly 
Jock Finlay (1882–1933), Scottish footballer 
John Baird Finlay (1929–2010), Dominican Republic-born Canadian politician, member of the Canadian House of Commons 1993–2004 
John Finlay (Canadian politician) (1837–1910), Canadian politician, member of the Canadian House of Commons 1904–1908
John Finlay (Dean of Leighlin) (1842–1921), Irish Dean of Leighlin, 1895–1912
John Finlay (footballer) (1919–1985), English footballer
John Finlay (fur trader) (1774–1833), Canadian fur trader and explorer with the North West Company 
John Finlay (poet) (1782–1810), Scottish poet

See also
John Finley (disambiguation)
John Findlay (disambiguation)